In 2007, the three Belgian Hautes Ecoles (Colleges) of the Province of Liège (Léon-Eli Troclet, André Vésale and Rennequin Sualem) came together in a single large ensemble called Haute Ecole de la Province de Liège (HEPL).

This college delivers different bachelor's and master's degrees in the following categories:

Technical: master in science in industrial engineering in chemistry, bio-chemistry, electronics, computer science, electro-mechanics, construction, land surveyor; bachelor in computer science and system, graphical techniques, electro-mechanics, construction, chemistry, industrial science.
Agronomic
Economics
Paramedics
Educational
Social

See also
List of colleges and universities by country

External links
Official Web site (www.hepl.be)

Buildings and structures in Liège Province
Universities in Belgium
Educational institutions established in 2007
Forestry in Belgium
2007 establishments in Belgium